Global surveillance whistleblowers are whistleblowers who provided public knowledge of global surveillance.

Perry Fellwock
Perry Fellwock revealed the existence of then ultra secretive National Security Agency (NSA) and its global mass surveillance apparatus and activities, including domestic spying, in a 1971 Ramparts exposé. This was the first wide exposure of the NSA, which had for decades prevented public knowledge of its abilities and activities. The revelations led the U.S. Senate Church Committee to introduce successful legislation intended to stop the NSA spying on American citizens.

Russ Tice
In December 2005 Russ Tice helped spark a national controversy over claims that the NSA and the Defense Intelligence Agency (DIA) were engaged in unlawful and unconstitutional wiretaps on American citizens. He later acknowledged that he was one of the sources that were used in The New York Times reporting on the wiretap activity in December 2005. After speaking publicly about the need for legislation to protect whistleblowers, Tice received national attention as the first NSA-whistleblower in May 2005 before William Binney, Thomas Andrews Drake, Mark Klein, Thomas Tamm, and Edward Snowden came forward.

Mark Klein
Mark Klein is a former AT&T technician who leaked knowledge of his company's cooperation with the NSA in installing network hardware to covertly monitor, capture, and process American telecommunications en masse. The subsequent media coverage became a major story in May 2006.

In recognition of his actions, the Electronic Frontier Foundation (EFF) picked Klein as one of the winners of its 2008 Pioneer Awards.

For over 22 years Mark Klein worked for AT&T. Starting with the company as a Communications Technician in New York, where he remained from November 1981 until March 1991, he later continued in that capacity in California until 1998. From January 1998 to October 2003, Klein worked as a Computer Network Associate in San Francisco. From October 2003 to May 2004 he returned to the role of Communications Technician, after which he retired in May 2004.

William Binney
William Binney is a former highly placed intelligence official with the NSA turned whistleblower who resigned on October 31, 2001, after more than 30 years with the agency. He was a high-profile critic of his former employers during the George W. Bush administration, and was the subject of FBI investigations, including a raid on his home in 2007. He came forward with NSA colleagues J. Kirk Wiebe and Edward Loomis, in cooperation with House Permanent Select Committee on Intelligence staffer Diane Roark.

Thomas Tamm
Thomas Tamm is a former attorney in the United States Department of Justice (DOJ) Office of Intelligence Policy and Review (OIPR) during the period in 2004 when senior Justice officials fought against the widening scope of warrantless NSA surveillance that consisted of eavesdropping on U.S. citizens. He was an anonymous whistleblower to The New York Times, making the initial disclosure regarding the issue.

Thomas Drake
Thomas Andrews Drake is a former senior executive at the NSA, a decorated United States Air Force (USAF) and United States Navy (USN) veteran, and a whistleblower. In 2010 the government alleged that Drake "mishandled" documents, one of the few such Espionage Act cases in U.S. history. Drake's defenders claim that he was instead being persecuted for challenging the Trailblazer Project. He is the 2011 recipient of the Ridenhour Prize for Truth-Telling and co-recipient of the Sam Adams Associates for Integrity in Intelligence (SAAII) award.

On June 9, 2011, all 10 original charges against him were dropped. Drake rejected several deals because he refused to "plea bargain with the truth". He eventually pleaded to one misdemeanor count for exceeding authorized use of a computer; Jesselyn Radack of the Government Accountability Project (GAP), who helped represent him, called it an act of "civil disobedience."

Edward Snowden
Edward Snowden is an American computer specialist, a former Central Intelligence Agency (CIA) employee, who, while working as a Booz Allen Hamilton contractor, disclosed top secret NSA documents to various media outlets, initiating the NSA leaks, which reveal operational details of a global surveillance apparatus run by the NSA and other members of the Five Eyes alliance, along with numerous commercial and international partners.

The release of classified material was called the most significant leak in US history by Pentagon Papers leaker Daniel Ellsberg. A series of exposés beginning June 5, 2013 revealed Internet surveillance programs such as PRISM, XKeyscore, and Tempora, as well as the interception of US and European telephone metadata, among other disclosures.

See also
 William Hamilton Martin and Bernon F. Mitchell
 Joseph Nacchio
 James Bamford
 John Crane
 List of whistleblowers

References

Global
Whist